Mandeville is a city in St. Tammany Parish, Louisiana, United States. Its population was 11,560 at the 2010 U.S. census, and 13,192 at the 2020 United States census. Mandeville is located on the north shore of Lake Pontchartrain, south of Interstate 12. It is across the lake from the city of New Orleans and its southshore suburbs. It is part of the New Orleans–Metairie–Kenner metropolitan area.

Etymology 
Mandeville is the name of two villages in Normandy, France. It means "big farm" (from Magna Villa) in medieval Norman French.

History 

The city of Mandeville was founded in 1834 by Bernard Xavier de Marigny de Mandeville (1785-1868). The Marigny family was a prominent family of Louisiana, owning nearly a third of the city of New Orleans. The area had long been agricultural land when the town of Mandeville was laid out in 1834 by developer Bernard Xavier de Marigny de Mandeville, more often known as Bernard de Marigny. In 1840, Mandeville was incorporated as a town. It became a popular summer destination for well-to-do New Orleanians wishing to escape the city's heat.

In the mid-19th century, regular daily steamboat traffic between New Orleans and Mandeville began, and by the end of the Victorian era, it had become a popular weekend destination of the New Orleans middle class, as well. Bands played music on the ships going across the lake and at pavilions and dance halls in Mandeville, and the town became one of the first places where the new "jazz" music was heard outside of New Orleans. Bunk Johnson, Buddy Petit, Papa Celestin, George Lewis, Kid Ory, Edmond Hall, Chester Zardis, and many other early jazz artists regularly played in Mandeville.

In the late 19th century, Mandeville was home of the Harvey School (Mandeville), a college preparatory institution.

Two buildings from early jazz history still stand in Mandeville. Ruby's Roadhouse has been in continuous operation since the 1920s (formerly Buck's Brown Derby and Ruby's Rendezvous) and is still a popular bar and live music venue today. The Dew Drop Social and Benevolent Hall, listed on the National Register of Historic Places, opened in January 1895.  For years, the hall hosted some of the jazz greats and was reopened in 2000 as the Dew Drop Jazz and Social Hall, a live jazz venue. (This was one of the earliest "Dew Drop" dance halls; venues across the South were similarly named, including the club in New Orleans where Little Richard got his start.)

In 1956, the first span of the Lake Pontchartrain Causeway opened to automobile traffic. A second span was added in 1969. The new road spurred the growth of Mandeville and the surrounding area as a suburban commuter community for people working in New Orleans. This trend increased in the 1980s and 1990s, further integrating Mandeville into the greater New Orleans metropolitan area.

Mandeville is home to Northlake Behavioral Health System, formerly Southeast Louisiana Hospital, a mental-health facility. Louisiana governor Earl Long was committed here in 1959 amid much controversy. It remains as one of the largest mental health providers in Louisiana. In 2016, Northlake became a 501(c)(3) not--or profit hospital with a mission to provide quality services to individuals with mental and behavioral concerns. The hospital and its  team of professionals are valued members of the community, who prioritize giving back through different partnerships and organizations. Northlake is a teaching hospital that provides Louisiana medical and clinical professionals an active and supportive teaching environment. Northlake Behavioral Health System is involved with the National Alliance on Mental Illness and Louisiana State University, and is accredited by the Joint Commission. 
 
Mandeville is also home to the largest certified southern live oak tree, the Seven Sisters Oak.

Mandeville was affected by Hurricane Katrina's storm surge on August 29, 2005, and received water and wind damage. Parts of the city also experienced less dramatic flooding when Lake Pontchartrain overflowed its banks due to Hurricane Ike in 2008. By 2009, most of the reconstruction from Katrina was completed. Many homes and businesses in areas that experienced flooding have been elevated.

Mandeville was named one of the Relocate America Top 100 Places to Live in 2004, 2005, 2007, 2008, and 2009.

Mandeville was among the recipients of Google's eCity award in 2013, given to those cities whose small businesses most effectively employ the internet to attract customers.

Geography
The Tchefuncte River flows through Madisonville, where a human operated swing bridge still connects suburban Mandeville to Madisonville.

Demographics

The 2020 census by the United States Census Bureau determined 13,192 people lived in Mandeville. The racial and ethnic makeup at the 2019 American Community Survey was 90.2% non-Hispanic white, 2.8% Black and African American, 2.8% Asian, 0.2% some other race, 0.4% two or more races, and 3.6% Hispanic and Latin American of any race.

At the 2000 United States census, 10,489 people, 4,204 households, and 2,724 families were residing in the city. The were 4,669 housing units had an average density of 686.9/sq mi (265.1/km). The racial makeup of the city was 92.15% White, 4.79% Black and African American, 0.31% Native American, 1.16% Asian, 0.06% Pacific Islander, 0.59% from other races, and 0.93% from two or more races. Hispanic or Latin American people of any race were 2.43% of the population.

In 2000, of the 4,204 households, 30.6% had children under 18 living with them, 50.6% were married couples living together, 10.8% had a female householder with no husband present, and 35.2% were not families. About 29.8% of all households were made up of individuals, and 11.4% had someone living alone who was 65 years of age or older. The average household size was 2.46, and the average family size was 3.11. In the city, the population was spread out, with 27.3% under the age of 18, 7.3% from 18 to 24, 28.9% from 25 to 44, 24.5% from 45 to 64, and 11.9% who were 65 years of age or older. The median age was 38 years. For every 100 females, there were approximately 89.2 males. For every 100 females age 18 and over, there were about 84.7 males. At the 2019 American Community Survey, the median age was 43.7 and 77.0% of the population were aged 18 and older; 18.3% of the population were aged 65 and older.

In 2019, the median household income was $72,989 and males had a median income of $76,573 versus $50,707 for females. In 2000, median income for a household in the city was $52,500, and the median income for a family was $70,043. Males had a median income of $50,891 versus $30,554 for females. The per capita income for the city was $26,420. About 4.9% of families and 7.6% of the population were below the poverty line, including 7.1% of those under age 18 and 13.7% of those age 65 or over.

Sports and recreation
Fontainebleau State Park – Features camping, cabins, nature trail and a sandy beach
Pelican Park – Sports complex
Northlake Nature Center - The Northlake Nature Center is an independent non-profit corporation organized to preserve, study, and publicly exhibit the natural and cultural resources of the Florida Parishes in southeastern Louisiana.
Sunset Point Fisher's Pier & Park - Sunset Point pier extends over 400 feet onto Lake Pontchartrain with views of the world-famous Causeway Bridge. The park provides a free fishing pier that was destroyed during Hurricane Ida.

Education

Primary and secondary schools 

St. Tammany Parish Public Schools operates public schools serving the city.
 Elementary schools (Kindergarten-grade 3) serving sections of Mandeville include: Mandeville Elementary, Woodlake Elementary, and Pontchartrain Elementary. A small portion is assigned to Marigny Elementary School (Kindergarten and grade 1) and Magnolia Trace Elementary School (grades 2–3).
 Grades 4-6: Tchefuncte Middle School serves the majority of the city. Some portions are served by Lake Harbor Middle School, and Mandeville Middle School serves very small portions.
 Grades 7-8: Mandeville Junior High School serves the majority of the city. Small portions of the city are assigned to Fontainebleau Junior High, and Leonerd Monteleone Junior High.
 Mandeville High School serves the majority of the city. Small sections are served by Lakeshore High, and Fontainebleau High.

Private primary and secondary schools
The Roman Catholic Archdiocese of New Orleans operates Catholic schools:
 Mary Queen of Peace School
 Our Lady of the Lake School

Other private schools
 Cedarwood School
 Lake Castle Private School
 Northlake Christian School

Notable people

Mandeville is the hometown of Cajun fiddler and bandleader Amanda Shaw, the rock group 12 Stones, YouTube personality TJ Kirk, the post-hardcore band As Cities Burn, comedian Theo Von, Wilco bassist John Stirratt, and actor and environmentalist Ian Somerhalder. Actress Allison Scagliotti grew up in Mandeville. Willem McCormick lived here for a few years while writing music before moving to Los Angeles, as did former US soccer national team player Jason Kreis before entering MLS. Sirius XM's The Mike Church Show is broadcast from a studio in Mandeville five days per week by Mike Church, who is a native of the city. Singer/songwriter Lucinda Williams spent time in Mandeville as a child and noted the town in her song "Crescent City", which has been covered by others including Emmylou Harris. Former WWE wrestler, Brodus Clay has lived in the city of Mandeville since 2010. Former New Orleans Saints offensive lineman Jim Dombrowski lives in Mandeville. Former Saints wide receiver Rich Mauti lives in Mandeville, and his son, Saints linebacker Michael Mauti, is from Mandeville.

Mandeville has an active political scene, with Eddie Price having been elected mayor for several terms commencing in 1996. He stepped down as mayor on October 9, 2009, and subsequently pleaded guilty to charges including tax evasion and depriving citizens of honest services through mail fraud. The city council then selected Edward "Bubby" Lyons as interim mayor. White nationalist and white supremacist David Duke has a residence in Mandeville, and is a perennial candidate. His most notable electoral outcomes are his almost-wins for Senate in 1990 and Governor of Louisiana in 1991 and his successful bid for the Louisiana House of Representatives from 1989 to 1992.

Author Margaux Fragoso spent the final years of her life in Mandeville with her second husband, Tom O'Connor, and her daughter, Alicia McGowan, from her first marriage.

Sister city
Mandeville has one sister city, as designated by Sister Cities International:
  Colón, Panama

References

External links

 Northlake Behavioral Health System
 City of Mandeville official website
 Dew Drop Dance Hall history
 

Cities in Louisiana
Cities in St. Tammany Parish, Louisiana
Cities in the New Orleans metropolitan area